Ria Hall is a Māori recording artist and presenter on Maori TV's AIA Marae DIY in 2012-13.

Life and career
Hall was born in 1982 or 1983 and is of Ngāi Te Rangi/Ngāti Ranginui ancestry, and has three older sisters. She grew up in Maungatapu and attended Maungatapu School, Tauranga Intermediate and Tauranga Girls' College. At secondary school she became interested in singing through kapa haka and later joined the kapa haka group Waka Huia. In Wellington in 2006 Hall created a reggae band called Hope Road. She sang at the opening ceremony for the 2011 Rugby World Cup, and released her debut self-titled EP in 2011, which won Best Māori Album at the 2012 New Zealand Music Awards. In 2013 Hall featured as a guest vocalist on Stan Walker's single "Like It's Over".

Musical style and influences
Hall classifies her music as mainly roots and reggae, with influences of ragga, soul and hip hop music. She grew up listening to reggae, soul, hip hop and R&B, and her mother listened to country music.

Discography

Studio albums

Extended plays

Singles

As featured artist

Promotional singles

Guest appearances

Notes

References

External links
 
AudioCulture profile

New Zealand Māori women singers
New Zealand reggae musicians
21st-century New Zealand women singers
1980s births
Living people
Pacific reggae
Māori-language singers